William Marshall Swayne (December 1, 1828 – May 1, 1918) was a sculptor and writer who lived in Chester County, Pennsylvania.

Biography
William Marshall Swayne, commonly known as Marshall Swayne was born on December 1, 1828 in Pennsbury Twp., Chester Co. He was married to Mary S. Barnard in 1850 and had 8 children. At the suggestion of Supreme Court justice Noah Haynes Swayne William Marshall was
appointed to the United States Treasury Department by president Abraham Lincoln. Swayne had a farm in East Marlborough Township, Pennsylvania, and later lived in Kennett Square. He died on May 1, 1918.

Artistic career
Swayne was a self-taught artist who sculpted many figures from history and from life including General Anthony Wayne, Salmon P. Chase, Edwin M. Stanton, William H. Seward, Andrew Johnson, Bayard Taylor, General George Meade, Sam Houston, and John Hickman.

Bust of Lincoln
Swayne did several sculptures of Lincoln including a bust of the President while he posed for him and recited poetry to visitors. Lincoln said of the sculpture, "I have sat for several to model my likeness, but I like yours best."

The Division of Government, Politics, and Reform at the National Museum of American History (NMAH) houses a copy of Swayne's bust of Abraham Lincoln. It was donated to the Smithsonian Institution in 1940 by Swayne's heirs through Richard B. Swayne and Marion Swayne Richter.  It is bronzed plaster and is 30" high by 19" wide.  It is marked, "W.M. Swayne, Scpr. June 8, 1864."

The sculpture was last on view in 1999 when it was lent to the Lincoln Museum in Fort Wayne, Indiana, for an exhibition titled "Lincoln from Life."
Swayne also made several smaller copies of this bust that were given to family, friends, and president's. It is reported that 10 were made. President Fillmore was one among the ten that received a copy of Swayne's famous bust.

See also
Wager Swayne
Noah Haynes Swayne

Further reading
Lincoln lore: Issues 1487–1558, WILLIAM MARSHALL SWAYNE The Man Who Made A "Mud Head" of Lincoln – Austin Warren, Lincoln National Life Insurance Company, Lincoln Historical Research Foundation – 1962

References

External links
Entry for William Marshall SWAYNE, The Pennocks of Primitive Hall website, Gedpage Version 2.20 ©2000 on 25 December 2010 notes

Sculptors from Pennsylvania
People from Kennett Square, Pennsylvania
Writers from Pennsylvania
1828 births
1918 deaths
20th-century American sculptors
20th-century American male artists
19th-century American sculptors
19th-century American male artists
American male sculptors